The Genoa AON Open Challenger - Memorial Giorgio Messina is an annual tennis tournament held in Genoa, Italy, usually in September, since 2003. The event is part of the ''ATP challenger series and is played on outdoor clay courts. The tournament has been organized annually since 2003, with the sole exceptions of 2020 and 2021, when it was canceled because of the world COVID19 pandemic. The 2022 edition is the 18th tournament of the series.

Past finals

Singles

Doubles

References

External links 
 ChallengerGenova.com - Official website

 
ATP Challenger Tour
Clay court tennis tournaments
Sports competitions in Genoa
Tennis tournaments in Italy
2003 establishments in Italy
Recurring sporting events established in 2003